Jim Lemaigre is a Canadian politician who has been a member of the Legislative Assembly of Saskatchewan since winning the 2022 Athabasca provincial by-election. He defeated former federal MP Georgina Jolibois and won the traditional New Democratic stronghold constituency for the Saskatchewan Party. It is the first time a right-wing party has held the seat since its creation in 1908.

Personal life 
He is a member of the Clearwater River Dene Nation.

References 

Living people
Saskatchewan Party MLAs
Canadian police officers
First Nations politicians
21st-century Canadian politicians
21st-century First Nations people
Year of birth missing (living people)
Date of birth missing (living people)